Bombay rava or ravva or rawa or sooji, is a durum wheat product and a form of semolina. Rava is made by grinding husked wheat and is used in Indian cuisine to make savoury dishes such as rava dosa, rava idli, upma, khichdis. There are also sweet dishes made from it, take for example rava ladoo, and sooji halwa in North Indian cuisine which is also known as rava kesari/ kesari bath in South Indian cuisine.

There is another type of semolina (rava) known as chamba rava, which is a byproduct obtained while milling for wheat flour, Bombay rava is actually made of maida, and hence it is finer.

Process
Rava may be described as the residues of milled material, after the flour is ground in a flour mill (chakki). It is passed through a fine mesh till flour and rava are separated.

Usage
Bombay rava is used in India to make upma. It is also used as an ingredient in some varieties of dosa, especially the rava dosa.

References

Tamil cuisine
Karnataka cuisine
Wheat dishes
Cereals